The Cangahua Formation is a Late Pleistocene (Lujanian in the SALMA classification) geologic formation of the Pichincha Province in north-central Ecuador.

Fossil content 
The formation has provided insect fossils of:
 Coprinisphaera ecuadoriensis
 Phanaeus violetae

See also 

 List of fossiliferous stratigraphic units in Ecuador

References

Bibliography 
 

Geologic formations of Ecuador
Pleistocene Ecuador
Lujanian
Paleontology in Ecuador
Formations